Vesta may refer to:

Fiction and mythology
 Vesta (mythology), Roman goddess of the hearth and home
 Vesta (Marvel Comics), a Marvel Comics character
 Sailor Vesta, a character in Sailor Moon

Brands and products
 Lada Vesta, a car from Russian car manufacturer AVTOVAZ
 Swan Vesta (began 1883), a brand of matches
 Vesta case, metal containers for matches (which were previously called vestas)
 Vesta, a freeze-dried meal brand launched in the United Kingdom by Batchelors in the early 1970s, and now owned by Premier Foods.

Music
 Vesta (1957–2011), stage name of American recording artist Vesta Williams
 Vesta (album), 1986 album by Vesta Williams
 Vesta 4 U, 1988 album by Vesta Williams
 Vesta, a 2008 rock band made up of former members of The Juliana Theory

Places
 Monte Vesta, Lombardy, Italy
 Temple of Vesta, Rome, Italy
 Vesta Nunataks, Alexander Island, Antarctica
 4 Vesta, an asteroid

Canada
 Vesta Creek (Alberta), a stream in northern Alberta
 Vesta, a dispersed rural community in the municipality of Brockton, Bruce County, Ontario
 Vesta Creek (Ontario), a stream in Bruce County, Ontario

United States
 Vesta, Arkansas
 Vesta, Georgia
 Vesta, Indiana
 Vesta, Minnesota
 Vesta, Nebraska
 Vesta, Virginia
 Vesta, Washington

Science and technology
 4 Vesta, an asteroid
 Vesta family, group of asteroids that includes 4 Vesta
 Vesta (software configuration management) (developed 1993), advanced configuration management system released by Compaq
 Vestas (founded 1945), Danish manufacturer of wind turbines
 The Vesta parallel file system, a precursor of IBM's GPFS
 Vesta longifolia, a species of flowering plant in the family Araceae

Other uses
 Vesta (name), feminine given name
 IF Vesta, sports club in Uppsala, Sweden established in 1911
 Vesta Rowing Club (founded 1870), a rowing club based in London, England
 SS Vesta (1853–1875), a French iron screw steamer
 Vesta Battery Corporation (1897–1964), an automobile battery company
 Vesta, a genus of flowering plant, sole species Vesta longifolia

See also
 Marooned off Vesta, a short story by Isaac Asimov first published in 1939
 Vega (disambiguation)
 Vespa (disambiguation)
 Vestal (disambiguation)
 Vestas, a Danish manufacturer of wind turbines